The George Hotel was a hotel and bar formerly located at today's 73 George Street in Dunoon, Argyll and Bute, Scotland. Now a private residence, it is a Category C listed building, built around 1800.

Built in the Georgian style, the building is two storeys in the main block, three bays wide. It has an in-line extension on the right side of the building, which is two bays wide. It has astragal chimneys on all three stacks.

References

External links
GEORGE HOTEL, GEORGE STREET - Historic Environment Scotland
Dunoon, George Street, George Hotel at Canmore.org.uk

Hotels in Dunoon
Category C listed buildings in Argyll and Bute
Defunct hotels in Scotland
Listed hotels in Scotland
Listed buildings in Dunoon